In the geometry of hyperbolic 4-space, the small stellated 120-cell honeycomb is one of four regular star-honeycombs. With Schläfli symbol {5/2,5,3,3}, it has three small stellated 120-cells around each face. It is dual to the pentagrammic-order 600-cell honeycomb.

It can be seen as a stellation of the 120-cell honeycomb, and is thus analogous to the three-dimensional small stellated dodecahedron {5/2,5} and four-dimensional small stellated 120-cell {5/2,5,3}. It has density 5.

See also 
 List of regular polytopes

References 
Coxeter, Regular Polytopes, 3rd. ed., Dover Publications, 1973. . (Tables I and II: Regular polytopes and honeycombs, pp. 294–296)
Coxeter, The Beauty of Geometry: Twelve Essays, Dover Publications, 1999  (Chapter 10: Regular honeycombs in hyperbolic space, Summary tables II,III,IV,V, p212-213)

Honeycombs (geometry)
5-polytopes